The Dana Point Concours d'Elegance is an automotive charitable event held each year on the Monarch Beach Golf Links at the Monarch Beach Resort Resort in Dana Point, California. It is operated primarily as a Classic Car Club of America (CCCA) Concours, with additional classes showcasing interesting and relevant automobiles and motorcycles. The 2010 event was held Sunday, June 27, 2010 moving from its traditional date in September.

A Concours d'Elegance (French, literally "a competition of elegance") is an event open to both prewar and postwar collector cars in which they are judged for authenticity, function, history, and style. Classes are commonly arranged by type, marque (manufacturer), coachbuilder, country of origin, or time period. Judges select first-, second-, and third-place finishers for each class in the event, and the judges confer the "Best of Show" award on one car from the group of first-place winners. In addition, a group of honorary judges, individuals who have made significant contributions to the automotive industry or motorsports, award a number of subjective awards to recognize standout vehicles regardless of class ribbons, as well as memorial awards created to honor specific automotive industry personages.

History
The first Concours was held in 1983 and was known as the Newport Beach Concours d'Elegance. It was held on the campus of University of California, Irvine for the first 10 years before moving to Pelican Hill Resort. In 2008 the event moved to the Monarch Beach Golf Links at the Monarch Beach Resort in Dana Point and in 2010 the Concours organizing committee officially changed the name of the event to the Dana Point Concours d'Elegance to properly reflect its new home.

There was no Concours in 2020.

Each year's Dana Point Concours honors a featured marque, coachbuilder, type or classification:
2010: Alfa Romeo & Pininfarina
2009: Mercedes-Benz & Aston Martin
2008: Cadillac	
2007: 25 Years of Cars 	
2006: Mercedes-Benz 	
2005: Ferrari 	
2004: Rolls-Royce & Bentley 	
2003: Packard 	
2002: Aston Martin 	
2001: Jaguar 	
2000: Lincoln
1999: Packard 	
1998: British Sports Racing Cars	
1997: French Coachbuilders
1996: German Automotive Heritage	
1995: Italian Cars	
1994: British Auto Masterpieces 	
1993: Antiques	
1992: American Classics 	
1991: Mercedes-Benz 	
1990: Cadillac	
1989: Ferrari 	 
1988: Pierce-Arrow	 
1987: French Classics	 
1986: Duesenberg	 
1985: Rolls-Royce	 
1984: Packard 	 
1983: Bugatti Royale

History of locations:
2008–2019, 2021–: Monarch Beach Golf Links at the Monarch Beach Resort, Dana Point, CA
2004–2007: Strawberry Farms Golf Club, Irvine, CA
2002–2005: Hidden Valley Park, Irvine, CA
2000–2001: The Oaks, San Juan Capistrano, CA 
1994–1999: Pelican Hill Golf Club, Newport Coast, CA
1983–1993: University of California, Irvine, CA

Exhibitors
Prospective entrants must submit an application for each car, and the Concours field is selected from each year's pool of applicants.  Entrants also come from some of Southern California's leading car collections such as the Nethercutt Collection and Petersen Automotive Museum.

Best of Show winners 
2011: 1931 Bugatti Type 51 Dubos
2010: 1929 Auburn 8-120 Boattail
2009: 1951 Delahaye 235 Roadster
2008: 1937 Talbot-Lago T150-C-S Sport Coupe
2007: 1931 Cadillac Sport Phaeton V-16 Fleetwood
2006: 1936 Delahaye 135 Competition Convertible
2005: 1934 Duesenberg Walker LeGrande J534 Covertible
2004: 1912 Rolls-Royce Silver Ghost 
2003: 1932 Bugatti Type 49 Cabriolet
2002: 1937 Mercedes-Benz 540K Special Roadster 
2001: 1914 Rolls-Royce Silver Ghost Skiff 
2000: 1931 Duesenberg J Boattail Speedster
1999: 1939 Packard 1708 Sport Phaeton
1998: 1961 Aston Martin DB4 GT Zagato
1997: 1934 Voisin C27 Figoni Cabriolet
1996: 1906 Panhard Double Phaeton
1995: 1930 Isotta Fraschini 8A SS Castagna
1994: 1929 Rolls-Royce P11 Brewster Town car
1993: 1909 Winton 17 Touring
1992: 1939 Delahaye Type 165 Figoni et Falashi
1991: 1939 Mercedes-Benz 770 K Cabriolet B
1990: 1931 Bugatti Type 54 O-Uhlik Roadster
1989: 1922 Hispano-Suiza H6B Labourdette Skiff
1988: 1936 Mercedes-Benz 540K Roadster
1987: 1939 Delage  D8 120 Letourneur Sport Cabriolet 
1986: 1931 Cadillac 452 Fleetwood Sport Phaeton
1985: 1930 Duesenberg J  Boattail Speedster
1984: 1930 Cadillac V-16 Roadster
1983: 1935 Mercedes-Benz 500K

Charitable giving
The excess proceeds of the Dana Point Concours d'Elegance support the Ocean Institute, the Mary & Dick Allen Diabetes Center at Hoag Hospital as well as other Southern California youth charities.

References

External links
The Dana Point Concours d'Elegance official website

Auto shows in the United States
Concours d'Elegance
Annual events in California
Dana Point, California
Motorcycle Concours d'Elegance
Orange County, California culture
Charity events in the United States
Recurring events established in 1983
1983 establishments in California